İsmet Ay (28 December 1924 – 7 October 2004) was a Turkish actor.

Ay graduated from the Istanbul Municipal Conservatory Theater Department. He joined the City Theatres in 1948 and started his acting career there. After working at the City Theaters for a long period of time, he started to appear in movies. He worked for the City Theaters for 32 years before retiring in 1980. He gained acclaim for his role as "Sermet" in the Süper Baba series. Meanwhile, he continued his career on stage as a guest artist in the theatre founded by Tolga Aşkıner and Ali Poyrazoğlu. Towards the end of his life, the actor starred in the TV series Cennet Mahallesi even though he was suffering from poor health. Ay died in 2004 and was buried in Şile.

Awards 
 4th Ankara Film Festival, 1992, Best Supporting Actor - Seni Seviyorum Rosa
 Avni Dilligil Theatre Award, 1987, Best Actor - The Cherry Orchard
 Ministry of Culture, 1988, Best Actor

Theatre 

 Tartuffe : Molière - Istanbul City Theatres - 1992
 The Birds : Aristophanes - Istanbul City Theatres - 1989
 The Cherry Orchard : Anton Chekhov - Istanbul City Theatres - 1987
 The Liar : Carlo Goldoni - Istanbul City Theatres - 1969
 Bozuk Düzen : Güner Sümer - Ankara Art Theatre - 1965

Filmography 

 Abdülhamit Düşerken - 2002 
 Benimle Evlenir misin - 2001 
 Kara Kentin Çocukları - 1999 
 Kaçıklık Diploması - 1998 
 Cumhuriyet - 1998 
 Baba Evi- 1997 
 Tatlı Kaçıklar - 1996 
 İz - 1994 
 Süper Baba - 1993 
 Seni Seviyorum - 1992 
 Hiçbir Gece - 1989 
 Afife Jale - 1987 
 Hoşgeldin Ramazan - 1987 
 Asılacak Kadın - 1986 
 Kaşık Düşmanı - 1984 
 Renkli Dünya - 1980 
 Talihli Amele - 1980 
 Bir Yürek Satıldı - 1977 
 Özgürlüğün Bedeli - 1977 
 Fatoş Talihsiz Yavru - 1970 
 Kalbimin Sahibi - 1969 
 Acı İle Karışık - 1969 
 İnleyen Nağmeler - 1969 
 Bozuk Düzen - 1965 
 Tatlı Günah - 1961 
 Aslan Yavrusu - 1960 
 Can Yoldaşı - 1952

References

External links 
 

Turkish male stage actors
Turkish male film actors
Turkish male television actors
1924 births
2004 deaths
Male actors from Istanbul
20th-century Turkish male actors